Podgórze (meaning roughly "foot of the hill") may refer to the following places in Poland:
Podgórze, Zgorzelec County in Lower Silesian Voivodeship (south-west Poland)
Podgórze, a district of the city of Kraków
Podgórze, Lubin County in Lower Silesian Voivodeship (south-west Poland)
Podgórze, Kuyavian-Pomeranian Voivodeship (north-central Poland)
Podgórze, Lublin Voivodeship (east Poland)
Podgórze, Podlaskie Voivodeship (north-east Poland)
Podgórze, Suwałki County in Podlaskie Voivodeship (north-east Poland)
Podgórze, Łask County in Łódź Voivodeship (central Poland)
Podgórze, Łęczyca County in Łódź Voivodeship (central Poland)
Podgórze, Kielce County in Świętokrzyskie Voivodeship (south-central Poland)
Podgórze, Ostrowiec County in Świętokrzyskie Voivodeship (south-central Poland)
Podgórze, Białobrzegi County in Masovian Voivodeship (east-central Poland)
Podgórze, Gostynin County in Masovian Voivodeship (east-central Poland)
Podgórze, Lipsko County in Masovian Voivodeship (east-central Poland)
Podgórze, Ostrołęka County in Masovian Voivodeship (east-central Poland)
Podgórze, Płock County in Masovian Voivodeship (east-central Poland)
Podgórze, Pomeranian Voivodeship (north Poland)
Podgórze, Braniewo County in Warmian-Masurian Voivodeship (north Poland)
Podgórze, Elbląg County in Warmian-Masurian Voivodeship (north Poland)
Podgórze, Myślibórz County in West Pomeranian Voivodeship (north-west Poland)
Podgórze, Wałcz County in West Pomeranian Voivodeship (north-west Poland)